Guns N' Roses is an American hard rock band.

Guns and Roses may also refer to:

 Guns N' Roses (EP)
 Guns N' Roses (pinball)
 "Guns and Roses" (NUMB3RS), an episode of the American television show Numb3rs
 Guns and Roses: Ik Junoon, a 1999 Pakistani film
 Guns and Roses (2012 film), a 2012 Chinese film
 Guns and Roses (TV series), a Philippine television series
 Guns and Roses Volume. 1, the debut studio album of the Ghanaian-British grime band Ruff Sqwad
 Guns and Roses Volume. 2, the second studio album by Ruff Sqwad
 "Guns and Roses", a 2014 song by Lana Del Rey from her album Ultraviolence
 "Guns & Roses", a 2002 song by Jay-Z from his album The Blueprint 2: The Gift & The Curse
 "Gun's & Roses", an opening theme of the 2007 Japanese anime television series Baccano!